RURA (sometimes styled as Rura) are a Scottish folk band composed of Jack Smedley, Steven Blake, Adam Brown, and David Foley. The band gained prominence at the Celtic Connections festival starting in 2010. RURA were Danny Kyle Open Stage winners in 2011 at the Celtic Connections festival, and won for both "Up and Coming Artist of the Year" in 2011 and "Live Act of the Year" in 2015 at the Scots Trad Music Awards.

Band members 

 Jack Smedley – fiddle
 Steven Blake – pipes, whistle, piano
 Adam Brown – guitar
 David Foley – bodhrán, flute

Discography

Albums 

 Break It Up (2012)
 Despite the Dark (2015)
 In Praise of Home (2018)
 Live at the Old Fruitmarket (2020)
 Dusk Moon (2023)

EPs 
 Our Voices Echo (2022)

References

External links 

 

Scottish folk music
Scottish folk music groups
Celtic music groups